Pechiney SA was a major aluminium conglomerate based in France.  The company was acquired in 2003 by the Alcan Corporation, headquartered in Canada. In 2007, Alcan itself was taken over by mining giant Rio Tinto Alcan.

Prior to its acquisition, Pechiney grew to be the world's 4th largest producer and developer of aluminium products, employing 34,000 people and operating 320 manufacturing and sales facilities in 50 countries at the time it was purchased by Alcan.  The group operated in all facets of the aluminium industry from bauxite mining to the development of sophisticated applications of metal products  in addition to international commodities trading and brokerage of the metal on the London Metal Exchange (LME).

Pechiney gained worldwide recognition for its use of electrolysis technology, and was a leader in specialty packaging and aerospace applications.

History
The company was founded in 1855 by Henri Merle as a producer of caustic soda at a manufacturing facility in Salindres.  Founded as Compagnie des Produits Chimiques Henri Merle the company was renamed in 1897 the Société des Produits Chimiques d'Alais et de la Camargue.

The company first began producing aluminium metal in 1860 using a chemically-based process developed by Henri Sainte-Claire Deville in 1854 and was granted a 30-year monopoly by the French government.

During World War I (1914–18) Tréfileries et Laminoirs du Havre (TLH) acquired a large stake in the Société d'Alais et de la Camargue.
This company in turn took control of the Société électrométallurgique de Froges in 1919 to become the Compagnie des produits chimiques et électrométallurgiques d'Alais, Froges et Camargue.
Hippolyte Bouchayer represented TLH in Pechiney.

Pechiney had developed a significant presence in Europe in the 1930s and first prospected the American market in 1911 before acquiring a strong foothold there in the 1960s.  In the 1954, Pechiney expanded into Africa and subsequently it developed a presence in Australia, Latin America, Greece and Asia.

The corporate name was changed to Pechiney in 1948, after a former influential managing director referred to by the same name, A. R. Pechiney.

In 1962 TLH merged with the Compagnie française des métaux and became Tréfimétaux.
In 1967 Tréfimétaux was acquired by Pechiney and became the copper division of that group, contributing 8% of the group's total.

Brandeis Brokers
Brandeis (Brokers) Ltd was a broker and ring dealing member on the London Metal Exchange that operated as a subsidiary of Pechiney from 1981 through 2000, when it was banned from trading by the FSA.  Brandeis was one of the founding members of the London Metal Exchange in 1877.  In 2000, the company's customer accounts and trading positions were purchased by Standard Bank London.

See also
Alcan
History of aluminium

References

Sources

External links
 Venture capital website with corporate history of Pechiney SA
 Rio Tinto Alcan AP Technology

Aluminium companies of France
Former Rio Tinto (corporation) subsidiaries
Privatized companies of France